Sirshendu De is an Indian engineering scientist. He is a professor of the Department of Chemical Engineering at the Indian Institute of Technology in Kharagpur. Sirshendu De's research interests include membrane separations, transport processes and flow through micro-channels.

Sirshendu De obtained his Bachelors, Masters and PhD degrees in Chemical Engineering at the Indian Institute of Technology in Kanpur. He joined Indian Institute of Technology in Kharagpur in the year 1998. De has won almost every award in the field of Chemical Engineering from Amar Dye Chem award ( 2000) to Herdilia Award (2010). He has also won INAE Young Engineer award (2001),Young Engineer award, Department Of Science and Technology (2001), Sisir Kumar Mitra memorial award (2003), Department of Atomic Energy- SRC Outstanding Investigator award (2012) and Silver Jubilee Young Engineer award (2012) from the Indian National Academy of Engineering, New Delhi.

In 2011, he was awarded the Shanti Swarup Bhatnagar Prize for Science and Technology, the highest science award in India, in the engineering category.

He is also a Fellow of Indian National Academy of Engineering, and National Academy of Sciences, Allahabad. Besides being a prolific scientist, De has also published a number of books and holder of a number of patents. His most important invention being the low cost arsenic filter, whereby he designed an ultra low cost arsenic filter directed for the rural households of India. He is also the developer of an indigenous, low cost process for spinning dialysis membrane. He has won National Award for Technology Innovation in category of polymers in public healthcare as well as being adjudged in Top 10 of DST-Lockheed Martin award for IC2 Business Development Support for this technology.

De has over 250 international journal publications/peer reviewed articles, over 50 conference presentations (national and international). He is the hoder of 15 patents (national and international), has authored 8 books and 4 of his developed technologies have been transferred to the industry. His work has been cited over 3400 times, with his H-index being 34. Presently he is the INAE Chair Professor of Chemical Engineering at Indian Institute of Technology in Kharagpur.

Major research interests 

Membrane separations (analysis, design and development of ultrafiltration / reverse osmosis systems), Application of mathematical methods and modeling for transport processes; Heat and mass transfer; Modeling of material processing; Pollution control; Effluent treatment.

Products developed for research and industry 

1. A low cost hollow fiber membrane spinning unit

2. Complete table top set up of hollow fiber membrane module.

3. Design of pilot scale nanfiltration and ultrafiltration units.

4. Design of pilot unit for ceramic membrane filtration.

5. Design of low cost arsenic filter unit both for community and domestic scales.

References

Living people
Engineers from West Bengal
Recipients of the Shanti Swarup Bhatnagar Award in Engineering Science
1967 births
Indian chemical engineers
20th-century Indian chemists
Scientists from Kolkata